The 2014 iHeartRadio Music Awards was the inaugural music award show presented by iHeartMedia's platform iHeartRadio and NBC. The awards were held on May 1, 2014, at the Shrine Auditorium in Los Angeles. The awards show was announced on February 26, 2014. The nominations were compiled by the results of Mediabase charts, listener feedback and digital streaming data from the iHeartRadio platform and announced on March 26, 2014. The awards recognized the biggest artists and songs of the year. The show was directed by Hamish Hamilton. The voting took place on iHeartRadio's official webpage except for the "Instagram Award", where voting took place on social network Instagram.

Rihanna led the nominations with eight and also became the biggest winner of the night with four wins including Artist of the Year and Song of the Year.

NBC's telecast of the iHeartRadio Music Awards drew 5.4 million viewers overall and a rating of 1.7 in the key 18-to-49-year-old demographic.

Performances

Presenters 
Pitbull — Presented Hip-Hop/R&B Song of the Year
Selena Gomez — Presented Tribute of Female Artist
Blake Shelton — Introduced Luke Bryan
Pharrell Williams — Best Collaboration
Adam Lambert — Introduced Bastille
Lionel Richie — Presented Best Lyrics
Ashley Greene — Introduced Ed Sheeran
Lil Jon— Introduced Ariana Grande
Jared Leto — Presented Best New Artist
L.A. Reid — Introduced Usher
Mel B — Presented Best Fan Army
Dan Reynolds — Introduced Kendrick Lamar
Jason Ritter — Presented iHeartRadio Instagram Award
Hilary Duff — Presented iHeartRadio Young Influencer Award
Joe Manganiello — Presented Alternative Rock Song of the Year
Chester Bennington — Introduced Thirty Seconds To Mars
Sean "Diddy" Combs — Presented Song of the Year
Juanes — Introduced Shakira
Bobby Bones — Presented Country Song of the Year
Shakira — Introduced Blake Shelton
Juicy J — Presented EDM Song of the Year
Gwen Stefani — Presented iHeartRadio Innovator Award
Jennifer Lopez and Ryan Seacrest — Presented Artist of the Year

Winners and nominees

Multiple nominations and awards

References

2014
2014 in American music
2014 in California
2014 music awards
2014 in Los Angeles
May 2014 events in the United States